The wandering small-eared shrew (Cryptotis montivaga) is a species of shrew in the family Soricidae. It is endemic to Ecuador.

References

Cryptotis
Mammals of Ecuador
Taxonomy articles created by Polbot
Mammals described in 1921